Steuri is a surname. Notable people with the surname include: 

Erna Steuri (1917–2001), Swiss alpine skier
Fritz Steuri (1879–1950), Swiss mountain climber
Fritz Steuri II (1903-1955), Swiss alpine skier
Fritz Steuri Jr. (1908–1953), Swiss ski jumper

See also
Fritz Steuri (disambiguation)
Steuri Glacier, a glacier in Marie Byrd Land, Antarctica